Eamonn McKeon (7 July 1934 – 16 August 2017) was an Irish boxer. He competed in the men's middleweight event at the 1960 Summer Olympics.

References

1934 births
2017 deaths
Irish male boxers
Olympic boxers of Ireland
Boxers at the 1960 Summer Olympics
Sportspeople from Dublin (city)
Middleweight boxers